The Lunar or Shēngxiào  (生肖) coin series is a collection of British coins issued by the Royal Mint featuring the Chinese zodiac in celebration of Chinese New Year. First issued in 2014, the series has been minted in varying denominations of Silver and Gold as both bullion and proof.

Year of the Horse 2014

Reverse
The reverse design consists of a galloping Horse set against the background of the pre-historic Uffington White Horse located in Oxfordshire. Lettering on the coin reads "YEAR OF THE HORSE · 2014" plus details of the mass and metal content of the coin. The Chinese character for Horse (馬) is displayed near the coin's centre.

Mule Version
In March 2014, it was reported that a number of 1oz bullion coins had mistakenly been struck with the incorrect die. Around 38,000 of the Lunar Horse coins were struck with an obverse intended for the Britannia series while 17,000 Britannia coin were stuck with the obverse for the Lunar series.

Year of the Sheep 2015
The reverse design consists of two Yorkshire Swaledale sheep facing each other and the background consists of a forest of trees. As designer Wuon-Gean Ho explains "the ancient Chinese character for the word sheep looks a little bit like a tree" so the forest consists of a series of this character (羊). This character is further displayed near the coin's center. Across the top lettering reads "YEAR OF THE SHEEP · 2015" plus details of the mass and metal content of the coin.

Year of the Monkey 2016
The reverse design features a leaping Rhesus monkey jumping forward from a tree with another monkey also jumping in the background. Lettering on the coin reads "YEAR OF THE MONKEY· 2016" plus details of the mass and metal content of the coin. The Chinese character for Monkey (猴) is displayed in the lower right of the coin.

Year of the Rooster 2017
The reverse design features a crowing rooster amongst ten sea thrift flowers, the number ten symbolising of perfection in Chinese culture. Lettering on the coin reads "YEAR OF THE ROOSTER · 2017" plus details of the mass and metal content of the coin. The Chinese character for Rooster (雞) is displayed near the coin's centre. Unlike the previous coins in the series, the 2017 coin breaks the otherwise uniform smooth obverse design, opting for an obverse similar to that of the Britannia coin series.

Year of the Dog 2018 
Wuon-Gean explains on the Royal Mint's site that "The reverse design is a picture of a very happy, bounding dog that is jumping for joy! This dog is a mix between a West-Highland white Terrier and a Jack Russell – it’s really wirey and really energetic; he also looks like he’s smiling because his mouth is slightly open and it seems like he’s leaping across the waves. In reality the background is a hidden story, I like to put hidden motifs in my coins so the background is actually created from a nose pattern of another dog. The nose print is unique to every dog so the nose print is a portrait of another animal that this dog is potentially playing with – it’s a story of a dog in a landscape but the landscape is not what you expect it to be. The signature is in the foreground of the landscape and it’s looks like a little shell on a beach – it’s just a motif that says “Wuon-Gean” in very old characters at the front of the coin." The reverse design features the Chinese character (狗) displayed near the coin's center.

Year of the Pig 2019 
The reverse design on this Royal Mint Shēngxiào Collection coin celebrates the Year of the Pig. The design by Harry Brockway represents these traits and the cultural traditions behind the lunar calendar, and shows a female pig (or sow) suckling five piglets. Brockway includes an English Cottage in the background. Each coin features the traditional Chinese symbol for ‘pig’ appears below the sow's head (豬).

Year of the Rat 2020 
The rat is the seventh design in The Shēngxiào Collection and this coin was designed by illustrator P. J. Lynch. The design obviously features a rat itself, which had to be appealing and interesting. Lynch claims he shows a rat as it twists, responding to a noise or something happening nearby. The rat is momentarily vulnerable, but also curious and unafraid. Lynch adds “As well as the twisting body I was able to have fun with the rat’s long curvy tail, which weaves its way around the composition through the flowers. I chose peonies because of their popularity in China and association with good luck. The arch of text frames the upper hemisphere of the design, and then the only other element is the Chinese character for ‘rat’. I have placed this so that the trailing stroke echoes the shape of the rat’s face and jaw. I wanted them to look like continental plates on a globe that might belong together.” The Chinese character for rat  (鼠) is displayed near the coin's centre.

Year of the Ox 2021 
Harry Brockway on the Royal Mint site is quoted as saying “It was important to give an Eastern feel to the design yet with a ‘British twist". The design was inspired by eighteenth-century British paintings of prize cattle and he places the Ox in an English landscape.” Harry's design contains a variety of elements, including blossom trees and ploughs. He claims he explores the concept of a minimalist setting with a strong focus on the creature itself, the design has an emphasis on ‘less is more’. By stripping back the distractions and placing the ox centre stage, Harry believes his final design managed to portray the ox in its purest form. The Chinese character for Ox (牛) is displayed near the coin's centre.

Face Values

Mintage Figures

See also 

List of British banknotes and coins
Coins of the pound sterling
Royal Mint
The Queen's Beasts (coin)
Gold as an investment
Silver as an investment

Notes
Coin mass and metal content are only displayed of bullion coins
This feature only appears on proof coins

References

Coins of the United Kingdom
British gold coins
Silver coins
Currencies introduced in 2014
Bullion coins
Chinese New Year